The Ansbach was a German automobile manufactured from 1910 to 1913 by the forerunner of Faun, a company well known for its trucks and buses.  The 1559 cc, four-cylinder  Ansbach touring car was known as the Kautz.

Brass Era vehicles
Defunct motor vehicle manufacturers of Germany